San Jose de Buan, officially the Municipality of San Jose de Buan, is a 4th class municipality in the province of Samar, Philippines. According to the 2020 census, it has a population of 7,767 people.

San Jose de Buan was a municipal District Gandara from 1948 to 1969, when it was converted into a municipality.

Geography

Barangays
San Jose de Buan is politically subdivided into 14 barangays.
 Aguingayan
 Babaclayon
 Can-aponte
 Cataydongan
 Gusa
 Hagbay
 Hiduroma
 Hilumot
 Barangay 1 (Poblacion)
 Barangay 2 (Poblacion)
 Barangay 3 (Poblacion)
 Barangay 4 (Poblacion)
 San Nicolas
 Hibaca-an

Climate

Demographics

Economy

References

External links
 San Jose de Buan Profile at PhilAtlas.com
 [ Philippine Standard Geographic Code]
 Philippine Census Information
 Local Governance Performance Management System

Municipalities of Samar (province)